"It's Growing" is a 1965 hit single by The Temptations for the Gordy (Motown) label. Written by Miracles members Smokey Robinson and Pete Moore and produced by Robinson, the song was a top 20 pop single on the Billboard Hot 100 in the United States, on which it peaked at number 18. On Billboards R&B singles chart, "It's Growing" peaked at number 3.

This single was the follow-up to "My Girl", which was the first to feature David Ruffin as the Temptations new lead singer. Ruffin, as the song's narrator, tells his lover that his love for her keeps on growing each and every day, giving several comparations to illustrate how much it grows. The song starts with a toy piano playing before the drums kick start the song, going into mid-tempo dance number. Motown had hoped to repeat the success of the previous single by giving "It's Growing" a somewhat similar sound but with a bigger orchestration and adding The Andantes for additional backing vocals.

This single, the second from The Temptations Sing Smokey, would be backed by the Eddie Kendricks-led cover of The Miracles'  "What Love Has Joined Together." While not as successful as the previous single, it still made the Top 20 in the Pop charts, continuing Robinson's reign as the group's main producer.  Cash Box described it as "a slow-shufflin’, pop-r&b rhythmic romancer about a twosome who seem aptly suited to each other."

Other recordings
Otis Redding would cover this song in 1966. 
Fellow Motown group The Contours recorded a version  featuring Ruffin's eventual replacement Dennis Edwards in 1967. 
Bobby Taylor & the Vancouvers recorded a version that was released as the B-Side to the group's 1968 single "Malinda".
Kate Taylor recorded the song - as "It's Growin'" - on her 1978 self-titled album, the track featuring James Taylor on guitar and background vocals. Taylor himself remade the song for his 2008 album Covers, this version becoming an adult contemporary hit in 2008.
Classic rock singer Paul Rodgers included his version of the song on his 2014 cover album of soul classics The Royal Sessions.

Personnel
 Lead vocals by David Ruffin
 Background vocals by Eddie Kendricks, Melvin Franklin, Paul Williams, Otis Williams, and The Andantes: Jackie Hicks, Marlene Barrow and Louvain Demps
 Instrumentation by The Funk Brothers and the Detroit Symphony Orchestra (strings).

Chart history

Notes

External links
 See The Temptations sing and perform It's Growing at this link

1965 singles
The Temptations songs
Otis Redding songs
James Taylor songs
The Contours songs
Songs written by Smokey Robinson
Songs written by Warren "Pete" Moore
Song recordings produced by Smokey Robinson
1965 songs
Gordy Records singles
2008 singles